The Shaanxi Tongjia Fujia is a microvan produced by Shaanxi Automobile Group under the Shaanxi Tongjia brand. The Shaanxi Tongjia brand was launched in 2009 as the light commercial vehicle branch of the Shaanxi Automobile Group.

Overview

The Shaanxi Tongjia brand was launched in 2009 as the light commercial vehicle branch of the Shaanxi Automobile Group. It is the joint venture of Shaanxi Automobile Group, Shaanxi Aircraft Corporation, IAT Automobile Technology Co.,Ltd. and Baoji Gaoxin Automotive Industry Development company.  

The Shaanxi Tongjia Fujia was originally launched in 2010 in China with production starting on the 19th of September in 2010. As of October 27, 2015, the first variant of the Fujia for the logistics industry called the Dianniu No.1 was launched. 

The Shaanxi Tongjia Fujia is a 5-door van available as a passenger van or a panel van and can seat from 5 to 7 occupants.

Powertrain
The Shaanxi Tongjia Fujia is powered by a 1.3 liter inline-4 16 valve fuel injection engine code named LJ474Q3E2 developing 83hp mated to a 5-speed manual transmission. A 1.0 liter engine variant was also available.

Dianniu No.1/ No.2
An electric panel van version is also available for the logistics industry in China. The Dianniu No.1 6-seater electric variant is powered by a 38hp (28kW) and 170N·m electric motor codenamed YS132HD15. 

The Dianniu No.2 6-seater electric variant is powered by a 81hp (30kW) and 225N·m electric motor codenamed TZ185XSTJ017 and a 50kW and 200N·m electric motor codenamed TZ204XSB50.

References

Vans
Microvans
Rear-wheel-drive vehicles
Cars of China
Cars introduced in 2010